Rashida al-Qaili is a Yemeni journalist who ran for President in 2006 with an anti-corruption focus. She also intended to increase freedom. She was the second woman to stand after Sumaya Ali Raja. al-Qaili was a columnist whose satirical comments that appeared in the Al-Wasat newspaper and the Al-Shura newspaper until it was "suspended".

Her campaign was not taken seriously, and success was seen as unlikely, but it gained attention because of Yemen's culture.

References 

Year of birth missing (living people)
Living people
Yemeni women journalists